Super Inggo at ang Super Tropa (English: Super Inggo and the Super Group) is a Filipino animated TV series that aired on ABS-CBN. The series, composed of 14 episodes, was broadcast from November 22, 2009 to February 21, 2010, while reruns began on May 3, 2010. It is a spin-off of the television series Super Inggo.

Plot
The series tells the story of Budong, a poor boy who has a secret life as the superhero Super Inggo. Super Inggo, with his friends Ken and Teg, form the rookie superhero team, the Super Tropa. Other major characters are Budong's friends, Jomar and Maya, and Budong's mother, Pacita. Each episode, the protagonists find themselves in funny action-oriented adventures that provide life lessons by the end of the episode.

Production
Super Inggo at ang Super Tropa is the first collaborative project between ABS-CBN TV Production, represented by business unit head and Vice President for TV Production Enrico Santos, and the newly formed ABS-CBN Animation Department, led by business unit head Guia Jose, who has trained at the Hanna-Barbera Studios in the United States during the 1980s. She explained that the first Pinoy animation will run for two seasons, with each season tentatively containing 13 episodes that will approximately run for 22 minutes.

Enrico also elaborated that ABS-CBN has a vision of coming up with the country's very own renowned animation department, much like the Walt Disney company. He said that if Walt Disney has Mickey Mouse, ABS-CBN is investing on Super Inggo as its own trademark character.

Characters
Budong / Super Inggo: Despite being poor, Budong is a happy, hyperactive and well-meaning child. He is gifted with the ability to connect with people from all walks of life. In his own way, he takes care of everyone in their small town of Sto. Niño. Budong lives with Pacita, the woman he came to know as his mother. For Pacita, Budong would give and risk everything. After having discovered powers that he had inherited from his super hero father, Super Islaw, Budong attended the super hero school, the Power Academy, and becomes Super Inggo. Together with the Mighty Ken and the Amazing Teg, Super Inggo is a member of the Super Tropa that protects the town of Sto. Nino. His powers are flight, strength, the ability to project destructive fireballs and electric bolts, a sonic shriek, and the ability to generate a small hurricane.
Jomar: Jomar is Budong's wacky and loyal super best friend and sidekick. He knows everything about Budong, even Budong's secret life as a superhero. He gives advice to Budong whenever he needs it and cheers him up whenever he is down. Jomar always brings out the best in Budong. Jomar and Budong are inseparable. They grew up together and share the same dream of becoming a superhero. Jomar seems to have been abandoned by his mother, who works abroad. Jomar lives with the baker, Mang Kanor, also the father of Budong's crush, Maya.
Maya: After his mother Pacita, Maya is the love of Budong's life. Budong affectionately calls Maya “Babes.” Charming, cheerful, colorful and lovable, Maya gives inspiration to our rookie superhero. Maya is the daughter of Kanor, the kind neighborhood baker who takes care of Budong and Jomar's education. In exchange for Kanor sending them to school, Budong and Jomar act as Maya's bodyguards. Maya likes acting older than she actually is. She loves make-up, trinkets and all sorts of accessories to make herself more beautiful, especially for her ultimate crush, Super Inggo. What Maya doesn’t know is that Budong and Super Inggo are the same person.
Ken aka The Mighty Ken: Like Budong, Ken attended Power Academy, the school for superheroes-in-training. His alter-ego, the Mighty Ken is a member of the Super Tropa along with Super Inggo and the Amazing Teg. He is passionate with causes concerning the environment. Ken comes from a tribe of humans who can transform into animals at will. While Ken will acquire these abilities when he matures, as of the moment, all he can transform into is a house cat. In human form, he retains the speed and agility of a cat and has retractable claws.
Teg aka The Amazing Teg: Like Budong and Ken, Teg attended Power Academy, the school for superheroes-in-training. His alter-ego, the Amazing Teg is a member of the Super Tropa along with Super Inggo and Mighty Ken. Teg has the ability to generate kinetic energy that allows him and any objects he touches to bounce.
Jack aka The Prince of Darkness/P.O.D.: Nothing much is revealed in the animated series about the Prince of Darkness except that he has a long-standing grudge with Super Inggo. It is implied that he has been Super Inggo's enemy for a long time. Evil, petty, and nihilistic, the Prince of Darkness uses his "shadow magic" to sow discord in the town of Sto. Nino. His goals seem small-minded for his powers. By the end of the show's pilot episode, Inggo entombed the Prince of Darkness in the heart of Taal Volcano. By the Roboman episode, however, the Prince of Darkness emerged, incarnated as a young boy, Jack. It seems that his struggle to survive being imprisoned in the volcano has sapped most of his powers, which is the reason he emerged as a boy. His goal now is to get back his powers and defeat Super Inggo once and for all. He is trying to recruit other villains to create his own army. His powers seem to be magical in nature. He can create weapons out of his shadow, fly, produce shadow fire and teleport within a small area during battles.
Pacita: Despite the fact that she is not his birth mother, Budong considers Pacita as the best mom in the whole world. Pacita serves as Budong's inspiration in becoming a superhero. It is Budong's wish to protect her from harm that made him want to become a superhero in the first place. Pacita is a caring and supportive mother to Budong. She treats Budong as if he is her real son. She also accepts Budong's destiny of becoming a superhero—but not without hesitations. Like any good mother, she constantly worries about her son's safety. Even if she is powerless, she is willing to risk her life to keep Budong away from harm.

Cast
Super Inggo at ang Super Tropa features the voices of the original characters:
Makisig Morales as Budong/Super Inggo
Jairus Aquino as Jomar
Kathryn Bernardo as Maya
Joshua Dionisio as Ken
Andrew Muhlach as Teg
Toni Gonzaga

Episodes
The series was directed by Enrico C. Santos, with Randy Villanueva as headwriter. Obet Villela also wrote episodes 3, 4, 5 and 8, Christian Mark Vidallo also wrote episode 2, Pear Clemente wrote 3 and Fionna Acaba wrote episode 4.

See also
Super Inggo
Super Inggo 1.5: Ang Bagong Bangis

References

External links
Super Inggo Official Website
ABS-CBN Official Website

2009 Philippine television series debuts
2010 Philippine television series endings
2000s animated television series
2010s animated television series
ABS-CBN original programming
Animated superhero television series
Fantaserye and telefantasya
Filipino-language television shows
Philippine animated television series
Philippine drama television series
Sequel television series